Selenicereus setaceus, synonym Hylocereus setaceus, is a species of plant in the family Cactaceae. It is found in Argentina, Bolivia, Brazil, and Paraguay. Its natural habitats are subtropical or tropical dry forests, subtropical or tropical moist lowland forests, rocky shores, and sandy shores. It is not considered threatened by the IUCN.

References

External links

Night-blooming plants
setaceus
Taxonomy articles created by Polbot
Taxobox binomials not recognized by IUCN